John Lagrand (born October 15, 1849) was a Republican member of the Wisconsin State Assembly from Milwaukee for one term (1885–86), representing the Sixth Assembly district of Milwaukee County (the sixth and thirteenth wards of the City of Milwaukee).

Background
Lagrand was born in the sixth ward on October 15, 1849, and always resided in the state. He received a common school education and went into what his official biography described as "the livery and undertaking business". He was elected as alderman from the sixth ward in 1882.

Legislative service
Lagrand was elected to the Assembly in 1884, receiving 1,682 votes against 1,499 votes for Democrat G. J. Obermann. He was not the Republican candidate in 1886, and was succeeded by Populist Joseph Meyers.

Notes

1849 births
American funeral directors
Politicians from Milwaukee
Wisconsin city council members
Year of death missing
Republican Party members of the Wisconsin State Assembly